Raimonds Vaikulis (born February 4, 1980 in Preili) is a Latvian former professional basketball player.

Professional career
In 2008, with the BK Barons, he won the EuroCup and the Latvian Basketball League championship. He is a member of the Latvian national basketball team.

Honours
2003-04 Russian Cup (Ural Great)
2005-06 Latvian League (BK Ventspils)
2007-08 Latvian League (Barons LMT)
2007-08 FIBA EuroCup (Barons LMT)

References

1980 births
Living people
BC Dynamo Moscow players
BC Rakvere Tarvas players
Belfius Mons-Hainaut players
BK Barons players
BK Jūrmala players
BK Liepājas Lauvas players
BK Ventspils players
Latvian expatriate basketball people in Estonia
Korvpalli Meistriliiga players
Latvian men's basketball players
Latvian expatriates in Estonia
MBC Mykolaiv players
PBC Ural Great players
People from Preiļi
Shooting guards